Thomas Dublin is an American historian, editor and professor at Binghamton University. He is a social historian specialized in the working-class experience in the United States, particularly throughout New England and the Mid-Atlantic states.

Life and career
Dublin graduated from Harvard College with a B.A. in chemistry, Summa Cum Laude, and received his Ph.D from Columbia University. He serves as a Distinguished Professor of History at Binghamton University.

Awards
 1980 Bancroft Prize
 1980 Merle Curti Award
 2000 Guggenhein Fellow
 2006 Merle Curti Award
 2006 Philip S. Klein Award of the Pennsylvania Historical Association

Works

Editor

References

21st-century American historians
American male non-fiction writers
Living people
Harvard College alumni
Columbia University alumni
Binghamton University faculty
Year of birth missing (living people)
Bancroft Prize winners
21st-century American male writers